Bauhin — a family of physicians and scientists.

Jean Bauhin (1511–1582): a French physician, who moved with his family to Basel after conversion to Protestantism.
Two of his three sons:
Gaspard Bauhin, or Caspar Bauhin (1560–1624): Swiss-French botanist.
Johann Bauhin, or Jean Bauhin (1541–1613): Swiss-French botanist.
The ileocecal valve is also called Bauhin's valve, named after Gaspard Bauhin

Carl Linnaeus named the genus of plants Bauhinia after the two brothers.

French-language surnames
Medical families
Scientific families
Swiss families